The MG's is a 1973 instrumental album recorded by the MG's for Stax Records, but by 1973, leader/keyboardist Booker T. Jones and guitarist Steve Cropper were both estranged from Stax and residing full-time in Los Angeles, so remaining members Donald "Duck" Dunn and Al Jackson, Jr. recruited Bobby Manuel and Carson Whitsett to replace Cropper and Jones respectively.

Billed as "The MG's" since Jones was not involved with the project, the group released two singles, "Sugarcane/Blackside" and "Neckbone/Breezy" (the b-side was a non-album cut). The singles and the album were not commercially successful, but were critically well received.  The album included an instrumental cover of The Spinners's "One of a Kind (Love Affair)".

By 1975, Jones and Cropper agreed to reform the original lineup with Jackson and Dunn, but just days before their scheduled reunion, Jackson was murdered at his home in Memphis, Tennessee.

Track listing 
All tracks composed by Donald "Duck" Dunn, Al Jackson, Jr., Bobby Manuel, Carson Whitsett; except where indicated

Side One
 "Sugarcane" (3:06) (David Madden)
 "Neckbone" (3:25)
 "Spare Change" (3:51)
 "Leaving the Past" (7:18)

Side Two
 "Left Overs (Bucaramanga)" (2:59) (Luiz, Sainz, Serrano)
 "Blackside" (3:57)
 "One of a Kind (Love Affair)" (3:21) (Joseph B. Jefferson)
 "Frustration" (6:22)

Personnel 
The M.G.s
 Bobby Manuel – electric guitar, classical guitar, acoustic guitar
 Carson Whitsett – piano, Hammond organ, clavinet, Fender Rhodes, celesta
 Donald Dunn – bass guitar
 Al Jackson Jr. – drums, percussion

Notes 

Booker T. & the M.G.'s albums
1973 albums
Stax Records albums
Albums produced by Al Jackson Jr.
Albums produced by Donald "Duck" Dunn